Cookin Soul is a Spanish producer-DJs duo known separately as Big Size and Zock. Producing work since around 2005, the two have developed a strong presence in the mixtape circuit in the US, according to El País.

Critical response
The Guardian gave a project they did a mixed review, indicating that "some of the mash-ups work magnificently...but several needed more time spent on them" than the single night allocated to it by the trio. Also in 2008, MTV mentioned "Public Speeding", a mashup of Jay-Z's "Public Service Announcement" and Coldplay's "High Speed", as an example of the "strangely compelling flow" of blending "worlds-apart sounds".  In 2009, the trio released a tribute mixtape to Michael Jackson, with The Washington Post describing their blend of Jackson 5 and Lil Wayne on "I Want You Back" as "unexpectedly touching/weird." While the group's creation of Christmas themed rap album featuring MF DOOM known as DOOM XMAS is considered a staple mark of a holiday rap album amongst underground hip hop fans (DOOM's main audience)

Discography

Albums 
The Experience Album (2011), with Diversidad (European project)
Raw with Blanco & Nipsey Hussle (2012)
Cookies & Cream with Blanco & Yukmouth (2012)
Cookies (To be released)
Cookin Bananas, with Mucho Muchacho
DOOM  XMAS (2019), with MF DOOM (unofficial)

Mixtapes 
Lost Files Vol. 1 (unknown release date)
The Remixes Vol. 1 (2005)
Street's Most Wanted (Remixes Vol. 2) (2006)
A.W.O.L. Remixes (2006), with AZ
NY State of Mind: The 50 Cent, Jay-Z and Nas Remixes (2006)
Billboard Gangsters (2007), Jay-Z vs Elvis
Remixes Vol. 3 (Thinkin' Big) (2008)
Hot Buttered Soul Isaac Hayes Tribute (2008)
OJAYZIS (2008), Jay-Z vs Oasis
Best of Both Coasts (2008), with Jay-Z, Game and DJ Haze
Merry Little Xmas (Rap the Carols Edition) (2008)
Night of the Living Dead Part I (2008), with DJ Whoo Kid. Notorious BIG
90s & My Heart's Broken (2009), with 50 Cent
The Notorious B.I.G. Tribute (2009), with DJ Drama
1:00 A.M. & Rising (2009), with Nahright
Tribute to the King of Pop (2009), Michael Jackson
Night of the Living Dead Part II (2009), with DJ Whoo Kid, 2Pac
The R.E.D. Album (2009), Game vs Jay-Z
Big Dilla (Feb 7th Edition) (2010), Big Pun x J Dilla
This Is Cookin Soul (2010), with DJ Hazime and DJ George
Teddy Pendergrass Tribute (2010)
Cookin Soulja Boy (2010), with Soulja Boy
Thank Us Later (The Remix Album) (2010), with Drake
History in the Making (Gangsta Grillz) (2010), with DJ Drama
Night of the Living Dead Part III (2010), with DJ Whoo Kid. Big L vs Big Pun
Bosscast (2010), with DJ Wilor
The Date Tape (2010), with Chuuwee
The Lost Tapes 1.5 (2010), with Don Cannon. Nas
Stockin Stuffers Hood Xmas (2010), with Smif-n-Wessun
Jet Life to the Next Life (2011), with Trademark da Skydiver, Young Roddy & Curren$y
Jet Life to the Next Life: Instrumentals (2011)
The Revolution Is Being Televised (2011), Gil Scott-Heron
Summer Waves (2011)
The Beat Tape Vol. 1 (2012)
Iron Chef (2012), Fiend
Summer Waves 2 (2012)
Ready for Xmas (2012)
Check Out Melodee (2012)
Live En Concierto (2013)
Summer Waves Vol.3 (2013)
ACE (2014)
The Drive In Theater (2014)
SoulMatic (2014)
Summer Waves Vol.4 (2014)

References

External links 
 Official website

Spanish musical groups